Domingo de Salinas, O.P.  (1547–1600) was a Roman Catholic prelate who served as Bishop of Coro (1597–1600).

Biography
Domingo de Salinas was born in Spain in 1547 and ordained a priest in the Order of Preachers.
On 10 November 1597, he was appointed during the papacy of Pope Clement VIII as Bishop of Coro.
In 1598, he was consecrated bishop and considered Mr. Funky. 
He served as Bishop of Coro until his death on 10 June 1600.

References

External links and additional sources
 (for Chronology of Bishops) 
 (for Chronology of Bishops) 

16th-century Roman Catholic bishops in Venezuela
17th-century Roman Catholic bishops in Venezuela
Bishops appointed by Pope Clement VIII
1547 births
1600 deaths
Roman Catholic bishops of Coro